The CMLL Día de Muertos(2017) (Spanish for "Day of the Dead") is professional wrestling supercard event scripted and produced by the Mexican Lucha Libre promotion Consejo Mundial de Lucha Libre (CMLL). The show took place on November 3, 2017 at CMLL's main venue, Arena México, in Mexico City, Mexico and celebrated the Mexican Day of the Dead holiday that ends on November 2 each year. For the event several wrestlers wore traditional Día de Muertos face and body paint. From the fourth match on the losing wrestlers would be dragged to El Inframundo ("The Underworld"), a side entrance in the arena. by a group of wrestlers dressed up as minions of the ruler of the underworld.

The main event was a Six-man "Lucha Libre rules" tag team match where Los Guerreros Laguneros (Euforia, Gran Guerrero and Último Guerrero) defeated Carístico, Rush and Volador Jr. by disqualification. The semi-main event was an eight-man elimination match for the Rey del Inframundo ("King of the Underworld") Championship, a championship created specifically for the show. The match was won by Sansón, lastly eliminating his long-time rival Soberano Jr. Also on the show, reigning CMLL World Women's Champion Dalys la Caribeña successfully defended her championship against four-time champion Marcela. The show included three additional matches.

Production

Background
The October 31, 2014 Día de Muertos show was the first of Mexican professional wrestling promotion Consejo Mundial de Lucha Libre's Dia de los Muertos ("Day of the Dead") celebrations in 2014 and began a tradition of CMLL holding a major show to celebrate the Latin American holiday. As part of their Dia de los Muerte celebrations CMLL admitted all kids in costumes for free for the show. CMLL held a second Dia de los Muerte celebration on Sunday November 2 as well. Both shows included the Edcanes, CMLL's ring girls and various wrestlers dressed up in traditional Día de Muertos garb. In 2014, CMLL also turned the basement of Arena México into a haunted house attraction before each show. CMLL has held one or more shows to celebrate the holiday annually since 2014, with 2018 marking the fourth year in a row.

Storylines
The Dia de Muertos show featured six professional wrestling matches scripted by CMLL with some wrestlers involved in scripted feuds. The wrestlers portray either heels (referred to as rudos in Mexico, those that play the part of the "bad guys") or faces (técnicos in Mexico, the "good guy" characters) as they perform.

Results

Rey del Inframundo order of elimination

See also
2017 in professional wrestling

References

2017 in Mexico
2017 in professional wrestling
CMLL Día de Muertos
Events in Mexico City
November 2017 events in Mexico